VPL (Visible Panty Line) is an American fashion label founded in 2003  based on the idea of underwear as outerwear. VPL is certified as B Corporation in 2016 and benefits various causes including women's education.

The brand is known for its avant-garde and experimental designs that blend fashion and function.

Meaning
VPL is shorthand for "visible panty line" and its products are "meant to be seen." The brand draws inspiration from vintage swimwear and athletic wear from the Olympics.

Design and production process
VPL advocates sustainable production and slow designs. VPL developed unique designs and production process that utilize excess fabric from production to minimize fabric waste ("up cycle" program). VPL is sold in 25 countries, and stores include Barneys, Shopbop, Saks, Net a Porter, Bloomingdale's, Nordstrom, and Harvey Nichols. It also sells directly to customers, and its savings from fabric utilization and vertical distribution are donated to various causes and nonprofit organizations. 

Since 2021, digitized VPL designs and patterns have been made available for download on the platform of Yabbey, one of the largest online fashion design, patterns and instruction resources, and VPL products have been produced by over 1,000 makers from over 40 countries. VPL today relies on the decentralized production model for sustainability.

Movies, TVs, campaign, and celebrities
 Tracy Anderson Health
 Shay Mitchell Self
 Priyanka Chopra ABC Quantico
 New York City Ballet campaign
 Victoria Beckham W Magazine
 Gwen Stefani wearing VPL for Sweet Escape campaign
 Madonna on the cover of Vanity Fair
 Rihanna wearing VPL on stage in Athens
 Lady Gaga 
 Christy Turlington in Harper's Bazaar
Tilda Swinton in W Magazine
 Sophia Bush in One Tree Hill
 Jessica Alba in GQ
 Scarlett Johansson cover in Esquire
Jennifer Lawrence in The Hunger Games
 Blake Lively in Gossip Girl

Awards
 In 2006 VPL received an Ecco Domani Fashion Foundation award.
 In 2007 VPL was one of the top 10 finalists of CFDA / Vogue Fashion Award.
 In 2011 Finalist for WGSN Global Fashion Award for Outstanding New Store
 2012 Finalist for Woolmark Prize
 2012 Winner of CFDA/Lexus Eco Challenge

Brands
VPL Collection (beige label, top-end designer line)

References

External links

Clothing brands of the United States
Clothing companies based in New York City
Companies based in Los Angeles
Underwear brands
2003 establishments in New York (state)